Pauline Lisa Harris is a New Zealand academic. As of 2021 she is a senior lecturer at the Victoria University of Wellington.

Academic career
After an undergraduate at Victoria University of Wellington, Harris completed a MSc and a PhD titled ' A search for gamma ray burst neutrinos using the Radio Ice Cherenkov Experiment''' at the University of Canterbury, before returning to the Victoria University of Wellington.

Harris received many external grants, including A Matauranga Maori Scientific Investigation of Traditional Maori Calendars, Nga Takahuringa o te ao – The effect of Climate Change on Traditional Maori Calendars looking at calendars in Mātauranga Māori and High-magnetic-field Plasma Propulsion Systems Enabling Next Generation Small Satellite Missions'' with Nick Long developing satellite propulsion systems.

Selected works 

 Harris, Pauline, Rangi Matamua, Takirirangi Smith, Hoturoa Kerr, and Toa Waaka. "A review of Māori astronomy in Aotearoa-New Zealand." Journal of Astronomical History and Heritage 16, no. 3 (2013): 325–336.
 Hēmi Whaanga, Pauline Harris, Rangi Matamua. "The science and practice of Māori astronomy and Matariki" New Zealand Science Review Vol 76 (1–2) 2020

Personal life 

Harris is of Māori, Rongomaiwahine, Ngāti Rakaipaka and Ngāti Kahungunu descent.

References

Living people
New Zealand women academics
Year of birth missing (living people)
Ngāti Rongomaiwahine people
Ngāti Kahungunu people
New Zealand astronomers
New Zealand Māori women academics
University of Canterbury alumni
Victoria University of Wellington alumni
Academic staff of the Victoria University of Wellington